Geshe Langri Thangpa (གླང་རི་ཐང་པ། ; wylie: glang ri thang pa) (1054–1123) is an important figure in the lineage of the Kadampa and Gelug schools of Tibetan Buddhism. He was born in Phenpo, as Dorje Senge (རྡོ་རྗེ་ སེང་གེ ; wylie: rdo rje seng ge). His name derives from Langtang, the area in which he is said to have lived. He was a Kadampa master, and disciple of Potowa Rinchen Sel.

In the 2nd water bird year he founded Langtang Monastery (གླང་ཐང་  ; wylie: glang thang), as a Kadampa monastery. It later became a Sakya monastery.

He was the author of Eight Verses of Training the Mind (བློ་སྦྱོང་ཚིགས་བརྒྱད་མ། ; wylie: blo sbyong tshigs brgyad ma), considered a succinct summary of the Lojong (བློ་སྦྱོང་ ; wylie: blo sbyong) teachings of Mahayana Buddhism. He is said to be an emanation of Buddha Amitābha.

See also
 Geshe Chekhawa, author of Training the Mind in Seven Points, an explanation of Lojong
 His Holiness the Dalai Lama, Transforming the Mind: Eight Verses on Generating Compassion and Transforming your Life, Thorsons (2000) 
Lojong (Mind training)

References

Sources 
 Langri Tangpa's Eight Verses for Training the Mind
 Tibetan Himalayan Digital Library Online Dictionary

1054 births
1123 deaths
Gelug Buddhists
Kadampa Buddhists